Phyllonorycter minutella is a moth of the family Gracillariidae. It is known from Texas, United States.

The larvae feed on Quercus rubra. They mine the leaves of their host plant. The mine has the form of a blotch mine on the underside of the leaf.

References

minutella
Moths of North America
Moths described in 1878